Jean-Jacques Favier (Born April 13, 1949) is a French engineer and a former CNES astronaut who flew aboard the STS-78 NASA Space Shuttle mission. Favier was due to fly aboard the destroyed Columbia mission in 2003, but later signed out of the mission. Jean-Jacques Favier has been Deputy Director for Space Technology and Deputy Director for Advanced Concepts and Strategy at CNES, Director of the Solidification Laboratory at the French Atomic Energy Commission and Research Program Director at the International Space University.

Personal data
Born in Kehl, Germany, he later married Michèle Jean. They have four children. He enjoys downhill skiing, tennis, wind-surfing, and archeology.

Education
 Attended primary and secondary schools in Strasbourg, France
 1971: Received an engineering degree from the INPG-ENSEEG (Grenoble Institute of Technology).
 1977: Earned a Ph.D. in engineering from the École des mines de Paris
 1977: Earned a Ph.D. in metallurgy and physics from the University of Grenoble

Organizations
 Research Engineer, Commissariat à l'énergie atomique (CEA), 1976-1979
 Head Solidification Group 1970-1986
 Head of Laboratory 1986-1989
 Head Solidification and Crystal Growth Service, 1989 to 1993
 Cons. European Space Agency (ESA)
 Centre National D’Etudes Spatiales (CNES), Paris 1983 to present
 spationaut Candidate CNES, Paris 1985 to present
 Member of Space Station User Panel of ESA.

Awards and honors
 Recipient Zellidja Association 2nd prize, French Academy Literature 1970, E. Brun Price Award French Academy Sciences
 Member of International Organization of Crystal Growth
 Member of American Association of Crystal Growth
 Societe Francaise de Metallurgie
 Groupe Francais de Croissance Cristalline (Committee Chairman)
 Visiting Professor at University of Alabama in Huntsville (UAH) (1994–95)
 Member of the Space Science Committee of the European Science Foundation (ESF)
 Several patents on crystal growth processes, furnaces and in situ diagnosis
 French Legion d’Honneur
 NASA Space Flight Medal
 The Gold Medal of the City of Grenoble
 Published more than 130 research articles in refereed scientific journals and books.

Career
Favier was the Advisor to the Director of the Material Science Research Center (CEREM) at the French Atomic Energy Commission (CEA) and was detached to CNES. He proposed the MEPHISTO program, a collaborative project between the French Space Agency and NASA, and has developed many other scientific projects in collaboration with the United States since 1985. He was the principal investigator for a MEPHISTO materials processing experiment, which made its debut on the United States Microgravity Payload in 1992 and 1994. He became a CNES payload specialist in 1985. He has been principal investigator of more than ten space experiments in collaboration with ESA, NASA, and the Russian Space Agency.

Favier was assigned as an alternate payload specialist on STS-65/IML-2, the second International Migrogravity Laboratory mission, and supported the mission as a Crew Interface Coordinator (CIC/APS) from the Payload Operations Control Center (POCC) at the Marshall Space Flight Center in Huntsville, Alabama.

Favier flew on STS-78 and logged over 405 hours in space. STS-78 Columbia (June 20 to July 7, 1996) was a 16-day Life and Microgravity Spacelab mission. It included studies sponsored by ten nations and five space agencies, was the first mission to combine both a full microgravity studies agenda and a comprehensive life science investigation, and served as a model for future studies on board the International Space Station. STS-78 orbited the Earth 271 times, covering 7 million miles in 405 hours, 48 minutes.

Favier is a member of the board of advisors of the International Space University and also the chair of the research steering committee. He is co-founder of remote imaging company called "Blue Planet", aimed at building a constellation of micro-satellites which image with a 1-meter resolution

External links
 
 Spacefacts biography of Jean-Jacques Favier
 Earth from Space: Interactive Astronaut Panel, Michael Barratt, Jean-Jacques Favier, Thomas Marshburn, Donald A. Thomas, the 13th Ilan Ramon International Space Conference, February 2018

References

French materials scientists
French spationauts
1949 births
Living people
People from Kehl
Grenoble Alpes University alumni
20th-century French scientists
21st-century French scientists
Space Shuttle program astronauts